Bertolt-Brecht-Literaturpreis is a literary award in Augsburg, Germany, birthplace of Bertolt Brecht.  It has been awarded every three years since 1995.  With a prize of €15,000, it is considered one of the most prestigious literary awards in Germany.  It is awarded to writers and personalities "who have distinguished themselves through the critical analysis of the present day in their literary works."  The 2006 edition marked the 50th anniversary of the death of Brecht.

Award winners

References

External links

German literary awards
1995 establishments in Germany
Awards established in 1995